Steve Forrest (born William Forrest Andrews; September 29, 1925 – May 18, 2013) was an American actor who was well known for his role as Lt. Hondo Harrelson in the hit television series S.W.A.T. which was broadcast on ABC from 1975 to 1976. He was also known for his  performance in Mommie Dearest (1981).

Early years
Forrest was born William Forrest Andrews in Huntsville, Texas, the 12th of 13 children of Annis (née Speed) and Charles Forrest Andrews, a Baptist minister. One of his older brothers was film star Dana Andrews.

Forrest enlisted in the United States Army at the age of 18 and fought in the Battle of the Bulge during World War II. In 1950, he earned a bachelor's degree with honors from UCLA, majoring in theater with a minor in psychology.

Career 
Forrest worked as a stagehand at the La Jolla Playhouse outside San Diego. There Gregory Peck discovered him, cast him in La Jolla's production of Goodbye Again, and then arranged for Forrest's first screen test with MGM, where he was signed to a contract.

Among Forrest's notable films were So Big, for which he won the Golden Globe Award for New Star of the Year – Actor, The Longest Day, North Dallas Forty, and Mommie Dearest. He had cameo roles in the comedies Spies Like Us and Amazon Women on the Moon, and the 2003 film version of S.W.A.T.

Forrest was also a trained vocalist, and he made his debut on Broadway as boxer Bob Stanton in the 1958 production of the Harnick and Bock musical The Body Beautiful opposite Mindy Carson, Jack Warden and Brock Peters.

Forrest played later U.S. Senator William Borah in the 1963 episode "The Lion of Idaho" of the syndicated television anthology series Death Valley Days. In the storyline, Borah as a young attorney defends a woman in Nampa, Idaho, on a murder charge.

In 1965, Forrest and his family moved to London, where he starred as John Mannering in the title role of the British crime drama The Baron. His other television credits included The DuPont Show with June Allyson, Storefront Lawyers, S.W.A.T., Hollywood Wives, and Rod Serling's hour-long Twilight Zone episode "The Parallel", as well as Serling's Night Gallery segment "The Waiting Room".

On a 1969 episode of Gunsmoke titled "Mannon", he portrayed Will Mannon (one of the very few men ever to outdraw Matt Dillon), then reprised the character 18 years later for the 1987 television film Gunsmoke: Return to Dodge with James Arness.

Jock Ewing, the character played by Jim Davis in the television series Dallas from 1978 to 1981, was presumed to have been killed in a helicopter crash during the 1981–82 season, although Jock's body was never found. This storyline was written into the series script on account of Davis' real-life death. In 1986 Lorimar Television, now renamed Lorimar Tele-Pictures, extended Forrest's contract from the 1985–1986 season of "Dallas" (the "Dream Season"), during which he had played the character Ben Stivers. They brought him back as a similar character renamed Wes Parmalee, who would be revealed to actually be Jock Ewing, in the 1986-87 season. While the season was still in production, the news leaked that Forrest would be playing the new Jock Ewing. Fans of the show believed the new storyline was disrespectful to the memory of Davis. Lorimar was forced to drop the Wes Parmalee character and change the story outcome.

In 1953, he earned the Most Promising Newcomer award from the Golden Globes for his performance in the Warner Bros. film 'So Big'. In a career that spanned six decades, among films he appeared in were 'Prisoner of War' (1954), 'The Living Idol' (1957), 'Flaming Star' (1960), 'The Longest Day' (1962), 'Rascal' (1969), 'The Wild Country' (1970), 'North Dallas Forty' (1979), 'Mommie Dearest' (1981), 'Sahara' (1983), 'Amazon Women on the Moon' (1987) and 'S.W.A.T.' (2003). Among television series he was featured in were 'Playhouse 90', 'Outlaws', 'Death Valley Days', 'The Virginian', 'Rawhide', 'Bonanza', 'Insight', 'Alias Smith and Jones', 'Ironside', 'Night Gallery', 'Medical Center', 'The Rookies', 'Dallas', and 'Murder, She Wrote', however his most memorable TV role was that of Lt. Dan 'Hondo' Harrelson on 'S.W.A.T.' from 1975 through '76.

Personal life
Forrest married Christine Carilas on December 23, 1948. They had three sons: Michael, Forrest, and Stephen.

An avid and accomplished golfer, Forrest often played in charity tournaments. He competed in 1976, for example, on the U.S. team at the Bing Crosby Great Britain vs. U.S.A. Tournament, which was held that year in Scotland at Gleneagles.

Forrest died of natural causes on May 18, 2013, in Thousand Oaks, California, aged 87.

Partial filmography

The Ghost Ship (1943) as Sailor (uncredited)
Sealed Cargo (1951) as Holtz (uncredited)
Geisha Girl (1952) as Rocky Wilson 
The Bad and the Beautiful (1952) as Actor in Georgia's Screen Test (uncredited)
The Clown (1953) as Young Man
Last of the Comanches (1953) as Lt. Floyd (uncredited)
Battle Circus (1953) as Sergeant
I Love Melvin (1953) as Photographer on Crane (uncredited)
Dream Wife (1953) as Louis
The Band Wagon (1953) as Passenger on Train (uncredited)
So Big (1953) as Dirk DeJong
Take the High Ground! (1953) as Lobo Naglaski
Phantom of the Rue Morgue (1954) as Prof. Paul Dupin
Prisoner of War (1954) as Cpl. Joseph Robert Stanton
Rogue Cop (1954) as Eddie Kelvaney
The Long Gray Line (1955) as Sergeant (uncredited)
Bedevilled (1955) as Gregory Fitzgerald
Meet Me in Las Vegas (1956) as Steve Forrest (uncredited)
The Living Idol (1957) as Terry Matthews
Alfred Hitchcock Presents (1957, TV Series) as Steve Archer / Joe Rogers
It Happened to Jane (1959) as Lawrence Clay 'Larry' Hall
Heller in Pink Tights (1960) as Clint Mabry
Dick Powell's Zane Grey Theatre (1960, TV Series) as Mike Bagley
Five Branded Women (1960) as Sargeant Paul Keller
Flaming Star (1960) as Clint Burton
The Second Time Around (1961) as Dan Jones
The Longest Day (1962) as Captain Harding
The Twilight Zone (1963, TV Series) as Major Robert Gaines
The Yellow Canary (1963) as Hub Wiley
The Virginian (1963–1964, TV Series) as James Templeton / Roger Layton
Twelve O'Clock High (1965, TV Series) as Maj. Peter Gray
Rawhide (1965, TV Series) as Cable
The Fugitive (1965, TV Series) as Barry Craft
Burke's Law (1965, TV Series) as Jocko Creighton
The Baron (1966–1967, TV Series) as John Mannering 'The Baron'
Cimarron Strip (1967–1968, TV Series) as Clayton Tyce / Wiley Harpe
Bonanza (1967-1969, TV Series) as Dan Logan / Josh Tanner
Rascal (1969)  as Willard North
Gunsmoke (1970–1973, TV Series) as Scott Coltrane / Cord Wrecken / Cole Morgan / Will Mannon
The High Chaparral (1970, TV Series) as Johnny Rondo
The F.B.I. (1970) as Lee Barrington
The Wild Country (1970) as Jim Tanner
The Late Liz (1971) as Jim Hatch
Mission: Impossible (1971, TV Series) as Edward Granger
Nichols (1971, TV Series) as Sam Yeager
Alias Smith and Jones (1972, TV Series) as Jake Halloran
Night Gallery (1972, TV Series) as Grant Wilson (segment "Hatred Unto Death") / Sam Dichter (segment "The Waiting Room")
The Sixth Sense (1972, TV Series) as Glenn Tuttle
Ghost Story (1972, TV Series) as Andrew Alcott
Hec Ramsey (1972, TV Series) as Wes Durham
The Streets of San Francisco (1973, TV Series) as Art Styles
The Hanged Man (1974) (TV pilot) as James Devlin
The Six Million Dollar Man (1974, TV Series) as Quail
Cannon (1974, TV Series) as Arthur Rogers
S.W.A.T. (1975–1976, TV Series) as Lieutenant Dan 'Hondo' Harrelson
Testimony of Two Men (1977, TV Series) as Martin Eaton
The Last of the Mohicans (1977, TV Movie) as Hawkeye
Maneaters Are Loose! (1978) as David Birk
The Deerslayer (1978) as Hawkeye
Captain America (1979, TV Movie) as Lou Brackett
North Dallas Forty (1979) as Conrad Hunter
Condominium (1980, TV Movie) as Gus Garver
Mommie Dearest (1981) as Greg Savitt
Hotline (1982, TV Movie) as Tom Hunter
Malibu (1983, TV Movie) as Rich Bradley
Sahara (1983) as Gordon
Hollywood Wives (1985, TV Series) as Ross Conti
Spies Like Us (1985) as General Sline
Dallas (1985 & 1986, TV Series) as Ben Stivers (1985) & Wes Parmalee (1986)
Amazon Women on the Moon (1987) as Capt. Steve Nelson (segment "Amazon Women on the Moon")
Gunsmoke: Return to Dodge (1987, TV Series) as Will Mannon
Dream On (1990, TV Series) as Eden Pilott
Storyville (1992) as Judge Quentin Murdoch
Columbo: A Bird in the Hand (1992) as Big Fred
Killer: A Journal of Murder (1995) as Warden Charles Casey
S.W.A.T. (2003) as SWAT Truck Driver (cameo) (final film role)

Radio appearances

References

External links
 
 
 
 Obituary - Hollywood Reporter
 Obituary - Dignity Memorial

1925 births
2013 deaths
Male actors from Texas
American male film actors
American male television actors
American male stage actors
Baptists from Texas
People from Huntsville, Texas
United States Army personnel of World War II
New Star of the Year (Actor) Golden Globe winners
Metro-Goldwyn-Mayer contract players
UCLA Film School alumni
20th-century American male actors
United States Army soldiers
21st-century American male actors
Western (genre) television actors
Burials at Valley Oaks Memorial Park
20th-century Baptists